Godfred Odametey (born 9 December 1999) is a Ghanaian professional footballer who last played as a midfielder for Ghanaian Premier League side Accra Great Olympics. He is a graduate of Attram De Visser Soccer Academy.

Career

Attram De Visser 
Odametey previously played for Attram De Visser Soccer Academy.  He joined Accra Great Olympics on a 1-year loan deal ahead of the 2017 Ghana Premier League.

Great Olympics 
In 2017, ahead of the 2017 Ghana Premier League, Odametey was signed on a 1 year long loan deal by then Godwin Attram along with nine other players including Christopher Nettey and David Amuzu. He made his debut during the first match of the season on 18 February 2017, playing the full 90 minutes in a 3–1 match against Ashanti Gold. He featured in 7 league matches within the season. He returned to Attram De Visser at the end of the season. In 2020, he was signed again by Accra Great Olympics ahead of the 2020–21 Ghana Premier League. He was named on the club's squad list for the season, but he featured in only 1 league match and was named on the bench for 8 matches before being released by the club at the end of the first round of the league season.

References

External links 

 

Living people
1999 births
Association football midfielders
Ghanaian footballers
Attram De Visser Soccer Academy players
Ghana Premier League players
Accra Great Olympics F.C. players